Javier Enrique Cárdenas Escalona (Maracay, Venezuela, August 2, 1988), better known as TopoMagico or Topo Mágico, is a Venezuelan Journalist, reporter,  YouTuber, blogger and activist for the rights of immigrants and a member of the non-governmental organization, Alliance for Venezuela.

Since 2014 he lives in Buenos Aires, Argentina.

He is currently part of No Me Simpatiza, a comedy podcast, recorded in Radio Capital.

Frequently gives conferences in different universities such as University of Palermo, National University of Lomas de Zamora and National University of La Matanza.

Biography

He started his project in 2016 helping the entire Venezuelan community in Argentina.

In 2017 he was appointed ambassador of the IOM (International Organization for Migration) for a UN campaign against racism and xenophobia.

It has 1 million followers on the TikTok and more than 170,000,000 views in total.

References 

Living people
Venezuelan journalists
Venezuelan activists
1988 births
Venezuelan emigrants to Argentina
Venezuelan YouTubers
Venezuelan bloggers
Argentine YouTubers
Spanish-language YouTubers